The Trail of the Coeur d'Alenes is a rail trail in the northwest United States, in northern Idaho. It follows the former Union Pacific Railroad right-of-way from Mullan, a mountain mining town near the Montana border, westward to Plummer, a town on the prairie near the Washington  Generally following the Coeur d'Alene River, the rail line was abandoned in 1991, and the trail officially opened in March 2004.

Trail route

The trail's  route winds through the mountainous terrain of historic Silver Valley, into the chain lakes region, along the shore of Lake Coeur d'Alene, over the Chatcolet Bridge to Heyburn State Park, and concludes with a climb to the northern Palouse prairie.

Trail users can continue along a bike path in Washington that leads to Spokane. The eastern half of the trail in Shoshone County has Interstate 90 nearby. In Kootenai County, I-90 leaves the river to head over Fourth of July Summit to the lake's north shore and the city of Coeur d'Alene, while the river and trail descends southwest toward Harrison, closer to State Highway 3.

Environmental impact
The trail is not only a recreational facility, but also a solution to environmental problems left behind by Idaho's mining industry. Silver, lead, and zinc were discovered in the valley around 1884, and a rail line was built to access the mines around 1888. Much of the rock in the railbed was either waste rock from mines, or tailings containing heavy metals.  The railbed was also contaminated with spillage from passing trains.

To remedy these environmental problems, the Union Pacific Railroad, U.S. government, the State of Idaho, and the Coeur d'Alene Tribe partnered to build a trail. The thick asphalt and the gravel barriers on the sides of the trail serve as a permanent cap to isolate contaminants from the surrounding environment. A portion of the trail is within the Coeur d'Alene Reservation, and an approximately  section of the trail is managed by the Tribe.

Recreational features
The Trail of the Coeur d'Alenes includes camping facilities and rest areas regularly. The trail leads through protected marsh lands, offering the cyclist a glimpse of eagle and osprey nests, moose, elk, and a variety of ducks and other wildlife, as well as some rare species of wildflowers and accompanying butterflies as a result of the age-old soot from the old railroad.

See also
 Route of the Hiawatha Trail
 List of Idaho state parks
 National Parks in Idaho

Notes

References

External links

 Trail of the Coeur d'Alenes Brochure and Map Idaho Department of Parks & Recreation and the Coeur d’Alene Tribe
 Trail of the Coeur d'Alenes Idaho Parks and Recreation
 Trail of the Coeur d'Alenes Trail Link
 Friends of the Coeur d'Alene Trail

Protected areas of Benewah County, Idaho
State parks of Idaho
Protected areas of Kootenai County, Idaho
Rail trails in Idaho
Protected areas of Shoshone County, Idaho
2004 establishments in Idaho
Long-distance trails in the United States
Protected areas established in 2004